The Stone of Setter is a Neolithic standing stone located on the island of Eday, in Orkney, Scotland. It  dates to the Late Neolithic or Early Bronze Age, around the 2nd millennium BC. Outside of the Stones of Stenness, this monument is the tallest monolith in Orkney. Historic Environment Scotland established the site as a scheduled monument in 1936.

Location
Situated 25m above sea level, in the north-central area of the island of Eday in Orkney, Scotland, the Stone of Setter overlooks Calf Sound. It is located near several burial monuments: the Vinquoy, Huntersquoy and Braeside chambered cairns. The stone is on private property, but can be seen from the road.

Description

The Stone of Setter is an extremely tall sandstone monolith of irregular shape. It dates to the Late Neolithic or Early Bronze Age, probably around 2nd millennium BC. It is deeply weathered with heavy vertical lines and stands in its original placement. 
Outside of the Stones of Stenness, this monument is the tallest monolith in Orkney.
Historic Environment Scotland established the site as a scheduled monument in  1936.

See also
Prehistoric Orkney
Ring of Brodgar
Callanish Stones

References

Buildings and structures completed in the 2nd millennium BC
Archaeological sites in Orkney
Prehistoric Orkney
Scheduled Ancient Monuments in Orkney
Megalithic monuments in Scotland
Late Neolithic
Menhirs